Billboard year-end top 50 R&B singles of 1963 is the year-end chart compiled by Billboard magazine ranking the top rhythm and blues singles of 1963. The list was based on charts from the January 6 through the November 23 issues. 

"Part Time Love" by Little Johnny Taylor ranked as the year's top R&B single. It was Taylor's only top 40 pop entry, reaching number 19 on the pop chart.

Motown and its affiliated divisions (Tamla and Gordy) emerged as a leading force with six of the year's top 20 R&B singles. Top hits from the Motown group included "Fingertips (Part II)" by Little Stevie Wonder (No. 4), "Heat Wave" (No. 5) and "Come and Get These Memories" (No. 50) by Martha and the Vandellas, "Pride and Joy" by Marvin Gaye (No. 6), "You've Really Got a Hold on Me" by The Miracles (No. 9), "Two Lovers" by Mary Wells (No. 17), and "Mickey's Monkey" by The Miracles (No. 19).

Several singles by white artists were included in the list including "Walk Like a Man" by The Four Seasons (No. 20), "Hey Paula" by Paul & Paula (No. 21), "I Will Follow Him" by Little Peggy March (No. 22), Ruby Baby" by Dion (No. 24), "It's My Party" by Lesley Gore (No. 26), "Sugar Shack" by Jimmy Gilmer and the Fireballs (No. 27), and "My Boyfriend's Back" by The Angels (No. 30).

See also
List of Hot R&B Singles number ones of 1963
Billboard Year-End Hot 100 singles of 1963
1963 in music

References

1963 record charts
Billboard charts
1963 in American music